Dalbergia entadoides is a species of liana (sometimes self-supporting), found in Cambodia, Laos, Thailand and Vietnam: with the Vietnamese name trắc bàm.  The genus Dalbergia is placed in the subfamily Faboideae and tribe Dalbergieae; no subspecies are listed in the Catalogue of Life.

References

External links

entadoides
Flora of Indo-China
Data deficient plants
Taxonomy articles created by Polbot